Robert Littell (born January 8, 1935) is an American novelist and former journalist who resides in France. He specializes in spy novels that often concern the CIA and the Soviet Union.

Littell was born in Brooklyn, New York, to a Jewish family, of Russian Jewish origin. He is a 1956 graduate of Alfred University in western New York. He spent four years in the U.S. Navy and served at times as his ship's navigator, antisubmarine warfare officer, communications officer, and deck watch officer.

Later Littell became a journalist and worked many years for Newsweek during the Cold War. He was a foreign correspondent for the magazine from 1965 to 1970.

Littell is an amateur mountain climber and is the father of award-winning novelist Jonathan Littell. His brother, Alan Littell (born 1929), is also an author and journalist.

He is the brother-in-law of the French writer Bernard du Boucheron.

Bibliography

Novels
The Defection of A. J. Lewinter (1973)
Sweet Reason (1974)
The October Circle (1975)
Mother Russia (1978)
The Debriefing (1979)
The Amateur (1981)
The Sisters (1986)
The Revolutionist (1988)
The Once and Future Spy (1990)
An Agent in Place (1991)
The Visiting Professor (1994)
Walking Back the Cat (1997)
The Company (2002)
Legends (2005)
Vicious Circle (2006)
The Stalin Epigram (2009)
Young Philby (2012)
A Nasty Piece of Work (2013)
The Mayakovsky Tapes (2016)
Comrade Koba (2019)

Semi-fiction
If Israel Lost the War (alternate history) (with Richard Z. Chesnoff and Edward Klein) (1969)

Non-fiction
For the Future of Israel (with Shimon Peres) (1998)

Films and Television
The Amateur (1981 film)
The Company (miniseries)
Legends (TV series)

Awards
The Defection of A. J. Lewinter. 1973 British Crime Writers' Association's Gold Dagger Award for fiction.
Legends. 2005 Los Angeles Times Book Prize in the Mystery/Thriller category.

References

External links

All Things Considered review of several books including Legends.

January Magazine interview
 Feature: "On Writing Young Philby" in Shots Ezine November 2012

1935 births
Living people
20th-century American novelists
21st-century American novelists
Alfred University alumni
American male journalists
Journalists from New York City
Newsweek people
Writers from Brooklyn
United States Navy officers
American male novelists
American expatriates in France
20th-century American journalists
20th-century American male writers
21st-century American male writers
Novelists from New York (state)
21st-century American non-fiction writers
Jewish American journalists
Jewish American novelists
American people of Russian-Jewish descent
21st-century American Jews